Kristian George Fletcher (born August 6, 2005) is an American soccer player who plays as a winger for D.C. United in Major League Soccer.

Club career 
Fletcher started his career playing for MLS Next club Bethesda SC and Landon School in Bethesda, Maryland. As a junior, Fletcher was named the All-Metro Player of the Year after scoring 26 goals and contributing 9 assists over the course of the 17 game season. He also led the team to the Interstate Athletic Conference (IAC) Championship, scoring the game.

During the summer of 2022, Fletcher went on trial with a number of European academies including Manchester United and Borussia Dortmund. Following the trip, Fox Sports reporter Keith Costigan announced that Fletcher would be signing for Bundesliga club Borussia Dortmund, although it was never confirmed. 

Ahead of the 2022 USL Championship season, Fletcher signed a contract with Loudoun United FC. He played 12 matches and scored four goals before being promoted to D.C. United on a homegrown contract. On August 31, 2022, he made his MLS debut in a 2–1 win at New York City FC. Fletcher scored his first goal with D.C. United on October 9, 2022, during a 2-5 loss against FC Cincinnati.

International career 
Though he holds both U.S. and British passports, Fletcher has only ever been called up by the United States, being capped by the USMNT at both U-15 and U-19 level.

This includes a spring of 2022 call up to the U-19 squad to play friendlies against both England and Norway in Marbella, Spain.

References 

2004 births
Living people
American people of British descent
D.C. United players
Loudoun United FC players
Soccer players from Maryland
Major League Soccer players
USL Championship players
Homegrown Players (MLS)